Hemisinidae is a family of freshwater snails with an operculum, aquatic gastropod mollusks in the superfamily Cerithioidea.

Genera
 Aylacostoma Spix, 1827
 Cubaedomus Thiele, 1928
 Hemisinus Swainson, 1840
 Pachymelania E. A. Smith, 1893
 † Pyrgulifera Meek, 1871 
Synonyms
 Basistoma I. Lea, 1852: synonym of Hemisinus (Basistoma) I. Lea, 1852 represented as Hemisinus Swainson, 1840
 Claviger Haldeman, 1842: synonym of Pachymelania E. A. Smith, 1893 (invalid: junior homonym of Claviger Preyssler, 1790 [Coleoptera]; Vibex, Pachymelania, Hemipirena and Itameta are replacement names)
 Gonioconcha Bonarelli, 1921 †: synonym of Pyrgulifera Meek, 1871 † (junior subjective synonym)
 Hantkenia P. Fischer, 1885 †: synonym of Pyrgulifera Meek, 1871 † (junior synonym)
 Hemipirena Rovereto, 1899: synonym of Pachymelania E. A. Smith, 1893
 Itameta Ihering, 1909: synonym of Pachymelania E. A. Smith, 1893
 Semisinus P. Fischer, 1885: synonym of Hemisinus Swainson, 1840 (invalid: unjustified emendation of Hemisinus Swainson, 1840)
 Vibex Gray, 1847: synonym of Pachymelania E. A. Smith, 1893 (Vibex Gray has consistently been treated as invalid and its junior objective synonym Pachymelania is in current use.)

References

 Bouchet P., Rocroi J.P., Hausdorf B., Kaim A., Kano Y., Nützel A., Parkhaev P., Schrödl M. & Strong E.E. (2017). Revised classification, nomenclator and typification of gastropod and monoplacophoran families. Malacologia. 61(1-2): 1–526.
 Glaubrecht M. & Neiber M.T. (2019). Hemisinidae Fischer & Crosse, 1891. pp. 51–55, in: C. Lydeard & C.S. Cummings (eds), Freshwater mollusks of the world. A distribution atlas. 242 pp. Baltimore: Johns Hopkins University Press

Cerithioidea